The Spanish school students' union is a student organization in Spain. It organises students in compulsory secondary education, baccalaureate, professional and university education; both public and private. It has about 20,000 members and has 3 of the 8 student representatives in the State School Board. It was founded in 1986 by members of the organization currently called Izquierda Revolucionaria. Its legal status comes from  Organic Law of Education of the Organic Law of the Right to Education.

Privatisation
Ana Garcia has blamed privatisation for the spread of corruption in the university sector.

Misogyny
The union called a student strike on 10 May 2018 in protest against what it saw as the sexism of the judiciary in the La Manada sexual abuse case

References 

Student organisations in Spain
Student organizations established in 1986
1986 establishments in Spain
Organisations based in Madrid